Eyad Abu Abaid (or Iyad, ; born 31 December 1994) is an Israeli professional footballer who plays as a defender for Israeli Premier League club Hapoel Be'er Sheva.

Early life
Abu Abaid was born in the Arab village of Meiser, Israel.

Club career
Abu Abaid made his debut for Maccabi Netanya on 12 August 2014 in a Toto Cup game against Maccabi Tel Aviv. Since then, he became a regular in the starting lineup.

On 25 June 2016, he signed for a three year contract with Maccabi Haifa in which he played 16 matches.

On 8 June 2017, Abu Abaid signed a contract for Hapoel Ironi Kiryat Shmona.

International career
He made his debut for the Israel national football team on 1 September 2021 in a World Cup qualifier against the Faroe Islands, a 4–0 away victory. He substituted Nir Bitton in the 84th minute.

Honours

Club 
Hapoel Be'er Sheva
State Cup: 2021–22
Super Cup: 2022

References

1994 births
Living people
Israeli footballers
Association football defenders
Israel under-21 international footballers
Israel international footballers
Beitar Nes Tubruk F.C. players
Maccabi Netanya F.C. players
Hapoel Tel Aviv F.C. players
Maccabi Haifa F.C. players
Hapoel Ironi Kiryat Shmona F.C. players
Hapoel Be'er Sheva F.C. players
Israeli Premier League players
Arab-Israeli footballers
Arab citizens of Israel